Paul K. Hurley (born October 23, 1961) served as the 24th Chief of Chaplains of the United States Army and is a Roman Catholic priest of the Archdiocese for the Military Services. Fr. Hurley retired on May 30, 2019, being succeeded by his Deputy Chief of Chaplains, Thomas L. Sohljem.

On March 27, 2015, the Senate confirmed Hurley's promotion to major general and assignment of Chief of Chaplains of the United States Army.

Hurley attended the United States Military Academy at West Point, and graduated there with the Class of 1984. Following graduation, he served two assignments as a field artillery officer in Germany and Fort Bragg, North Carolina, before he began to discern a call to the priesthood. He resigned his commission in 1990 and attended St. John's Seminary in Boston. He was ordained as a Roman Catholic priest in 1995 and spent five years as a parish priest in the Archdiocese of Boston before he rejoined the active duty Army Chaplain Corps in 2000. He most recently served as command chaplain for the XVIII Airborne Corps at Fort Bragg, North Carolina.

H. R. McMaster, a classmate of Hurley's from the West Point Class of 1984, swore Hurley in on May 22, 2015.

Awards and decorations

See also
Armed Forces Chaplains Board
Chiefs of Chaplains of the United States

References

External links

Chiefs of Chaplains of the United States Army
United States Army generals
Catholic chaplains
Living people
1961 births